The Lurgan Subdivision is a railroad line owned and operated by CSX Transportation in the U.S. states of Pennsylvania, Maryland, and West Virginia. The line runs from Chambersburg, Pennsylvania, south to Hagerstown, Maryland, and west to Cherry Run, West Virginia, along a former Western Maryland Railway line. It meets the Hanover Subdivision at Hagerstown and the Cumberland Subdivision at Cherry Run. The line is named after its former northern end in Lurgan Township, Franklin County, Pennsylvania, where the Western Maryland once connected to the Reading Company along the Alphabet Route.

History
The Western Maryland Railway, which had a main line from Baltimore to Williamsport, Maryland, made its first expansion into Pennsylvania in 1881.  The WM leased a line from the Baltimore and Cumberland Valley Rail Road and the Baltimore & Cumberland Valley Rail Road Extension Company, connecting Edgemont, Maryland to Shippensburg, Pennsylvania. In 1886 the line was connected in Shippensburg to the Harrisburg and Potomac Railroad, which was absorbed into the Reading system in 1891.

In 1899 the WM shortened the route between Chambersburg and Hagerstown with the construction of the Altenwald Cutoff.  This shortcut between Hagerstown and Quinsonia, Pennsylvania, reduced the steep grade for heavy coal trains, as well as the overall distance on the branch.  A portion of the cutoff was double tracked, which also improved the line's efficiency.  The remaining line between Quinsonia and Edgemont continued to operate with a lower level of traffic.  The section between Waynesboro, Pennsylvania, and Edgemont was removed in the late 1950s.

In the late 1920s the Reading built a new connection to the WM at Lurgan.

See also
 List of CSX Transportation lines

References

CSX Transportation lines
Rail infrastructure in Pennsylvania
Rail infrastructure in Maryland
Rail infrastructure in West Virginia
Western Maryland Railway